Tye Harvey (born September 25, 1974) is an American pole vaulter.

Harvey won the silver medal at the 2001 World Indoor Championships in Lisbon with a vault of 5.90 metres.

In March 2001 in Atlanta Harvey established a career best of 5.93 metres, on an indoor track.  His personal best outdoor vault was 5.81 metres, achieved in July 2000 in San Marcos, TX.

Since 2004, he has been married to Amy Acuff (born on July 14, 1975).

External links
 

1974 births
Living people
American male pole vaulters